The Lawyer is a 1970 courtroom drama film loosely based on the Sam Sheppard murder case, in which a physician is charged with killing his wife following a highly publicized and sloppy investigation.  The film was directed by Sidney J. Furie, starring Barry Newman as the energetic, opportunistic defense attorney Tony Petrocelli and  Diana Muldaur as his wife Ruth Petrocelli. The supporting cast features Robert Colbert, Kathleen Crowley (in her final role), and an unbilled bit part featuring an emerging, then-on-the-rise, star Michael Murphy as an intern in a legal office. The film is the source of the role Newman reprised in the  TV series Petrocelli.

Plot
Tony Petrocelli is a Harvard-educated attorney of Italian heritage who practices in an unidentified part of the American Southwest. He works (and drives) at a frenetic pace, not only because he is a zealous advocate for his defendants (which includes a regular run of drunks and other small-time criminal cases) but because of the vast distances of western prairie he must cross in order to meet clients, investigate his cases and make court appointments.

A big case lands in his lap when he is asked to defend a young, prosperous physician who expects to be charged with the bludgeoning murder of his socialite wife.

Cast
 Barry Newman as Tony Petrocelli
 Harold Gould as Eric P. Scott
 Diana Muldaur as Ruth Petrocelli
 Robert Colbert as Jack Harrison
 Kathleen Crowley as Alice Fiske
 Warren J. Kemmerling as Sergeant Moran (as Warren Kemmerling)
 Jeffery V. Thompson as Andy Greer (as Jeff Thompson)
 Tom Harvey as Bob Chambers
 Booth Colman as Judge Crawford
 Ken Swofford as Charlie O'Keefe
 E. J. André as F.J. Williamson
 William Sylvester as Paul Harrison
 Melendy Britt as Ann Greer
 John Himes as Myro McCauley
 Ivor Barry as Wyler
 Michael Murphy (uncredited) Intern at Legal Office

References

External links

New York Times movie review by Vincent Canby

1970 films
Films directed by Sidney J. Furie
1970s English-language films